Akka Nago is a 1968 Sri Lankan drama film directed by Vincent David.

Cast
 Stanley Perera
 Sandhya Kumari
 Joe Abeywickrama
 Dommie Jayawardena
 D. R. Nanayakkara
 David Dharmakeerthi
 Richard Albert
 Jessica Wickramasinghe
 Piyadasa Wijekoon
 Shirani Kurukulasuriya
 Janaki Kurukulasuriya
 Udula Dabare
 Lilian Edirisinghe
 Prasanna Fonseka

External links
Sri Lanka Cinema Database
 

1968 films
1960s Sinhala-language films